Nicolás Jarry was the defending champion but chose not to defend his title.

Facundo Mena won the title after defeating Gonzalo Lama 6–4, 6–4 in the final.

Seeds

Draw

Finals

Top half

Bottom half

References

External links
Main draw
Qualifying draw

Quito Challenger - 1
2021 Singles